Running Aces Casino and Racetrack is  5/8 mile harness horse racing track that is located in Columbus, Minnesota. The park also has a card room. The park opened in April 2008. The live races season runs from June through August.

References

Buildings and structures in Anoka County, Minnesota
Horse racing venues in Minnesota
Sports venues in Minneapolis–Saint Paul
Sports venues completed in 2008
Tourist attractions in Anoka County, Minnesota